is a district located in Wakayama Prefecture, Japan.

As of September 1, 2008, the district has an estimated Population of 56,219 and a Density of 85.8 persons/km2. The total area is 655.49 km2.

Towns and villages
Hidaka
Hidakagawa
Inami
Mihama
Minabe
Yura

Merger
On October 1, 2004 the village of Minabegawa merged into the expanded town of Minabe.
On May 1, 2005 the towns of Kawabe, Nakatsu and Miyama merged to form the new town of Hidakagawa.
On May 1, 2005 the village of Ryūjin merged into the city of Tanabe.

Districts in Wakayama Prefecture